State Technical College of Missouri (State Tech) is a public technical school in Linn, Missouri. In 2018, the college saw its highest enrollment at 1,483 students for the 2018–2019 school year and there were about 600 graduates in May 2019. Enrollment exceeded 2,000 students for 2021's fall semester, and State Tech was named Missouri's fastest growing college by The Chronicle of Higher Education.

History
State Tech began as Linn Technical Junior College in 1961, later being awarded the status of Area Vocational Technical School by the Missouri State Board of Education after the U.S. Vocational Education Act of 1963. The school dropped "Junior" from its name in 1968. In 1991, the college was granted the authority to give associate degrees. In 1995, Linn State Technical College separated from Osage County R-II School District after it obtained its own Board of Regents to administrate it. In 2013, The Missouri House of Representatives voted to change the school's name to its current one, effective July 1, 2014. The new name emphasizes the school's status as Missouri's only state-funded technical college, not funded by local property taxes, drawing students from throughout the state.

Facilities and resources
State Tech has various facilities and resources for use by its faculty, students, and local community.

Main campus
The main campus in Linn includes 11 academic buildings, cottage-style student housing, an activity center, and an airport. The most recently constructed academic buildings as of 2019 are the  Health Science Center and  Welding Technology Center. The  activity center opened in 2008; it includes three basketball courts, an elevated walking/running track, a fitness center, and an indoor archery range. The airport has a  runway and hangars available for public rental. Ninety-five percent of the academic and housing building space uses geothermal energy for its heating and cooling. The campus library is a charter member of MOBIUS, which provides interlibrary lending access across Missouri and several nearby states. The college acquired a  farm just east of the main campus, and rebuilt the ground floor of its farmhouse in 2017 to be used as the president's home and for social activities.

Lewis & Clark Career Center
State Tech's Advanced Manufacturing Technician program is hosted by the Lewis & Clark Career Center in St. Charles, Missouri.

Osage County Community Center
Adjacent to and managed by State Tech, the Osage County Community Center provides the college and community with an  facility for meetings, conferences, training, and social events. The center's  auditorium includes a catering kitchen.

Foundation
A non-profit foundation named for State Tech is its primary organization for fundraising to enable scholarships, faculty development, instructional equipment, facility construction, and other support to the college.

Recognition
Forbes magazine ranked State Tech as the third-best two-year trade school in the nation in 2018.

References

1961 establishments in Missouri
Buildings and structures in Osage County, Missouri
Educational institutions established in 1961
Education in Osage County, Missouri
Jefferson City metropolitan area
Public universities and colleges in Missouri
Technical schools
Two-year colleges in the United States